Giovanni Domenico Valentino (Rome, c. 1630- Imola, c. 1708) was an Italian painter of the late-Baroque, who specialized in a mix of genre and still life painting.

Sources

CREDEM collection in Reggio Emilia

External links

17th-century births
17th-century deaths
17th-century Italian painters
Italian male painters
Italian Baroque painters
Italian still life painters